The Van Buren County Road 2E Bridge is a historic bridge in rural southwestern Van Buren County, Arkansas. It was built in 1940 with funding from the Works Progress Administration, and is a well-preserved example of a period concrete bridge.

The bridge was listed on the National Register of Historic Places in 1995.

See also
National Register of Historic Places listings in Van Buren County, Arkansas
List of bridges on the National Register of Historic Places in Arkansas

References

Road bridges on the National Register of Historic Places in Arkansas
Bridges completed in 1940
National Register of Historic Places in Van Buren County, Arkansas
Concrete bridges in the United States
Transportation in Van Buren County, Arkansas
1940 establishments in Arkansas
Works Progress Administration in Arkansas